Major-General James Turner Cummins CB DSO (12 October 1843 – 24 October 1912) was a British military officer who served in the Indian Army.

Biography
He was born in Cork, Ireland in 1842, the son of Nicholas Cummins. He was educated at Cheltenham College and at Addiscombe Military Seminary. On passing out at Addiscombe in 1861 he was commissioned into the Madras Army. He was promoted to Captain in 1873. In 1875, Cummins transferred to the Madras Staff Corps and served in the Second Anglo-Afghan War between 1878-80. He thereafter served in the Anglo-Egyptian War of 1882 and was made a Major in 1883. In 1885 he took part in the Suakin Expedition and the Third Anglo-Burmese War where he was mentioned in dispatches twice. Following this he was appointed Assistant Adjutant-General to the Madras Force and became a Lieutenant Colonel in 1887 and Colonel in 1894. Between 1895-1900 he was placed in command of a 2nd class district. During the Boxer Rebellion in China in 1900 he commanded the 4th Infantry Brigade which was mentioned in dispatches. He was made a Companion of the Bath in 1901 and in 1903 he retired from service and returned to England. The following year he was appointed the honorary position of Colonel of the 30th Lancers (Gordon's Horse). He lived his latter years in London where he died in 1912. He married Louisa Dunman in 1869 and had two sons, Harry and Earnest.

References

British East India Company Army officers
1842 births
1912 deaths
Graduates of Addiscombe Military Seminary
British Indian Army generals
People educated at Cheltenham College
People from County Cork
Madras Staff Corps officers
British military personnel of the Second Anglo-Afghan War
British military personnel of the Anglo-Egyptian War
British military personnel of the Third Anglo-Burmese War
British military personnel of the Mahdist War
British military personnel of the Boxer Rebellion
Companions of the Distinguished Service Order